The 2011 BSN Finals was the championship series of the 2011 season of the Baloncesto Superior Nacional (BSN) and the conclusion of the season's playoffs. The champion Capitanes de Arecibo defeated the Piratas de Quebradillas, 4–1, to win their fifth BSN title.

The series was held from July to August 1, 2011. The Capitanes hosted Games 1, 3, and 5. Guillermo Diaz was named Most Valuable Player.

Background

This was the Capitanes twelfth appearance in the BSN Finals, and the Piratas fourteenth. It was the first time each team faced each other in the Finals. The Capitanes had home-court advantage by virtue of a better regular-season record than the Piratas.

Road to the Finals

Series summary

Game 1

Game 2

Game 3

The Capitanes dominated the first half of the game, 41-32, with a second quarter score of 27-10. Quebradillas, who had won the first quarter 22-17 only scored one field goal during the first 7:30 minutes of the second quarter. Arecibo had a 15-3 run and took the lead 32-25 during that time. There was also poor shooting efficacy in field goals, as both teams scored less than 42% of their shots during that half. The Piratas made a comeback in the third quarter with an 11-0 rally which closed the game to 44-43 with 5:52 to go. Six consecutive points from the Piratas allowed them to take the lead 52-46, while Arecibo suffered from foul trouble, particularly Danilo Pinnock, who already had three fouls. Quebradillas entered the last quarter with a 56-55 lead. In the last four minutes of the game, Peter John Ramos took control of the game for the Piratas, scoring five consecutive points, including a three-point play which gave his team a definitive lead of 72-71 with 1:50 to play. Ramos and P. J. Tucker scored two free throws each to seal the victory with 17 seconds. Quebradillas had a 10-2 run during the last minutes of the game, and Guillermo Díaz was the only Arecibo player to score during the last three minutes of the game, finishing with 21 points. Arecibo also relied too much on their three-point shooting, making only 9 of 31 attempts for a 29% average. Ramos finished the game with 27 points and 14 rebounds, while Darius Washington had 19 points, 9 rebounds, and 5 assists to lead Quebradillas.

Game 4

The Piratas led the first half, 22-18, and closed the second quarter with a 7-0 rally after Daniel Santiago had two consecutive baskets in the paint. In the third quarter, Arecibo started to put pressure on defense and limited Quebradillas to only 14 points to close out their lead to 59-57 when entering the last quarter. During that third quarter, Quebradillas only scored four field goals, the last of them, a basket from Peter John Ramos, with 7:15 on the clock. They finished the quarter with six free throws to maintain their lead. With 1:23 to play in the fourth quarter, the Piratas widened their lead to 7 points, 73-66, after consecutive baskets from Joel Jones and Peter John Ramos. Arecibo responded with a basket from Guillermo Díaz with 0:44 seconds. Then Quebradillas' David Huertas missed a three-point shot which allowed Danilo Pinnock to score three points himself to close the gap to 74-71 with 0:21 seconds. In the next possession, Darius Washington received a foul, but missed one of his free-throws giving Arecibo a chance to tie it. After that, Pinnock received the ball alone and scored a three-pointer with 4.7 seconds on the clock, leading the game into overtime. During the overtime, Diaz and Larry Ayuso took control of the game for Arecibo, scoring the first 11 points of their team in the extra time, including three 3-pointers. Diaz and Ayuso finished the game with 29 and 26 points respectively. This was the second game of the Finals that went to overtime.

Game 5

During the first quarter, Quebradillas' David Huertas scored 14 points, with 4 three-pointers. However, Arecibo played more aggressively and ended up leading the period 24-18, including a 9-0 rally. During the second quarter, Peter John Ramos joined Huertas as the scoring threats for the Piratas, finishing both with 26 points in the first half. However, it wasn't enough to take the lead and Arecibo finishes the half with a 43-42 lead, despite shooting 4-15 from the three-point line. Arecibo also leads in offensive rebounds 19-11. During the third quarter, the Piratas started with an erratic offensive, and their first basket came with 6:36 on the clock. However, they recovered and tried to take over with a 6-0 rally, but a technical foul from P. J. Tucker cut their momentum. Arecibo's Daniel Santiago also contributed with his defense, and several baskets, to help his team maintain the lead. The fourth quarter opened with four consecutive points from Arecibo. However, Quebradillas managed a rally of their own and closed the gap to 6 points, forcing the Capitanes to ask for a timeout. The Piratas won that quarter 22-17, but the Arecibo lead was already too much as they won the game by 5 points. Huertas and Ramos led the Piratas with 26 and 23 points respectively, while Larry Ayuso had 22 points for Arecibo.

Awards 
2011 BSN Champion: Capitanes de Arecibo
Finals MVP: Guillermo Díaz

Statistical leaders

References

External links
BSN Official website

Baloncesto Superior Nacional
2010–11 in American basketball
2011 in Puerto Rican sports